Quiet Riot II is the second studio album by the American heavy metal band Quiet Riot, released on December 2, 1978.

Overview
As with Quiet Riot's debut album, Quiet Riot II was released only in Japan, and to this day has never been officially released anywhere else. This is the final Quiet Riot album to feature lead guitarist and founder Randy Rhoads, who departed the following year to join former Black Sabbath vocalist Ozzy Osbourne in a new group. 

Although bassist Rudy Sarzo is credited and pictured on the album cover, Quiet Riot II was recorded before he joined the band, and the work of bassist Kelly Garni is featured on the album. Tensions between Garni and vocalist Kevin DuBrow boiled over during the album's recording, with Garni hatching a plan to shoot and kill DuBrow at the studio. Garni was arrested and immediately fired from Quiet Riot. 
 
The track Afterglow (Of Your Love) is a cover of a song by The Small Faces, composed by Steve Marriott and Ronnie Lane. The album's opening track, "Slick Black Cadillac", was re-recorded by Quiet Riot for their 1983 breakthrough album Metal Health.

Track listing

Personnel

Quiet Riot
Kevin DuBrow - lead vocals
Randy Rhoads - guitars, organ, backing vocals
Drew Forsyth - drums, syndrum, backing vocals 
Rudy Sarzo - bass (credited as band member but does not play on album)

Additional musicians
Kelly Garni - bass, backing vocals (uncredited)
The Killer Bees - backing vocals

Production
Warren Entner - producer, manager
Lee De Carlo - producer

References

1978 albums
Quiet Riot albums
Randy Rhoads